SNL often refers to Saturday Night Live, an American late-night live television variety show.

SNL may also refer to:

Businesses and organizations
 Sandia National Laboratories, an American research and development laboratory
 Scots National League, a 1920s political organization in Scotland
 Società Navigazione del Lago di Lugano, a Swiss boat transport company
 SNL Financial, a financial data company, now part of S&P Global

Sport
 Scottish National League (ice hockey), an ice hockey league
 Slovenian First Football League (Slovene: Prva Slovenska Nogometna Liga) (1. SNL)
Slovenian Second Football League (Slovene: 2. Slovenska Nogometna Liga) (2. SNL)
 Sportvereniging Nationaal Leger, a Surinamese football team

Other
 Shawnee Regional Airport (IATA code SNL), an airport in Oklahoma, US
 SnL, Shanell Lynn Woodgett (born 1980), American singer and songwriter
 Standard Nomenclature List, a U.S. Army logistical coding system 
 Store norske leksikon, a Norwegian encyclopedia
 Sunday Noontime Live!, a Philippine music variety show

See also
 S&L (disambiguation)
Saturday Night Live (disambiguation)